The Armed Forces of the Republic of Uzbekistan, is the name of the unified armed forces of Uzbekistan, consisting of the Ground Force and the Air and Air Defence forces under the defence ministry. Paramilitary units include the National Guard, a Frontier Service and a River Force. It is reported to be the largest, and the strongest in Central Asia.
'The country [has] also began professionalizing its military, an effort that has only limited success and erratic government support. But even in Uzbekistan, these changes represent merely a modest beginning and most of the benefits are concentrated in a few elite, higher readiness formations rather than uniformly applied to the entire force. The Uzbek military is woefully inadequate, but it is far superior to its neighbours.'

History

Pre-history 

Tashkent, the capital of Uzbekistan, used to be the headquarters of the Soviet Turkestan Military District and on 20 February 1992, the new Ministry of Defence took over the offices which had been formerly occupied by the district headquarters staff. The Uzbek SSR had the strongest Soviet military presence of the other Central Asian Republics, controlling its own and operating its own domestic Ministry of Internal Affairs (MVD) independent of the Ministry of Internal Affairs of the Soviet Union.

Establishment of armed forces and military institutions 
On 2 July 1992 a Presidential Decree established a Ministry of Defence to supersede the Ministry of Defence Affairs. Over the succeeding years, Uzbekistan replaced Russian officers with ethnic Uzbeks and restructured the military to focus on targets like civil unrest, drug trafficking, and Hizb-ut-Tahrir. The three major Soviet military academies, the Tashkent Higher All-Arms Command School, the Chirchiq Higher Tank Command and Engineering School, and the Samarkand Higher Military Automobile Command School, were located in Uzbekistan. This caused the government to not send Uzbek officers to Russia for training. In 1994, they established the joint Armed Forces Academy, to train officers of all branches. Though the Uzbek language was becoming more in use by the army, Russian remained the main language used in training officers, due to the fact that most manuals were in Russian. But today Uzbek language is used in all spheres of defense system as it is an only state language in Uzbekistan

Development 
In October 1993, by the decree, the 2nd Mobile Army Corps was formed on the basis of the 105th Guards Vienna Airborne Division, and the 1st Army Corps was established on the basis of the former 59th Army Corps. In January 1994, the 108th Motorized Rifle Division was disbanded, and its military units were incorporated into the 1st Army Corps. Disbanded regiments were replaced by motorized infantry, mountain artillery, tank, and anti-aircraft artillery brigades. In April 1994, departments of defense were introduced in the regions of the republic, the Republic of Karakalpakstan and the city of Tashkent, and departments of defense in cities and districts.

Military reforms were implemented after the appointment of civilian Kadyr Gulyamov to the defence ministry. Soviet-style regimental structures, were replaced, with the basic fighting unit consisting of 14 soldiers. "Ranger" detachments based on the American model were also formed.

Since Shavkat Mirziyoyev came to power, the military has been involved in re-arming its military with modern equipment.

Activities and foreign relations
From August to September 1997, Uzbekistan took part in the exercises of the Central Asian Battalion (CENTRASBAT) in Kazakhstan and Uzbekistan. as part of an eight nation joint exercise which include the United States, Russia and Ukraine. After the September 11, 2001 attacks, the United States leased the Karshi-Khanabad airbase in southern Uzbekistan, which borders Afghanistan. The American base there was called "Camp Stronghold Freedom," yet was more often referred to as "K2 Airbase" by the personnel in theater.

In May 2005, the military was involved in suppressing unrest in the Ferghana Valley city of Andijan, which became known as the Andijan massacre. Consequently, the EU banned arms sales and imposed a one-year visa ban on 12 senior officials, including the security chief and interior and defence ministers, accusing them of bearing responsibility for the killings.

In the aftermath of the incident, President Karimov dismissed several senior military figures: Defense Minister Gulyamov, Head of the Joint Headquarters of the Armed Forces Ismail Ergashev, and Commander of the Eastern Military District Kosimali Akhmedov. Burnashev and Chernykh said that '..although these dismissals did not change the formal system of administration in the security and military structures, they reflected serious shifts in power relations among regional elites representing their clans.'

A joint statement of the member countries of the Shanghai Cooperation Organisation issued in early July 2005 on a conference in the Kazakh capital of Astana called for a withdrawal of US troops from military bases in Central Asia. On 29 July 2005, Uzbekistan invoked a provision asking the U.S. to leave within 180 days. On 21 November 2005, the withdrawal of US troops from Karshi-Khanabad and any other bases was completed.

The European Union lifted the arms sales ban in 2009. Uzbekistan and Russia signed a mutual defence pact in 2005 for closer military cooperation. This marked a stark contrast to a few years earlier, when the US appeared to be Uzbekistan's favoured foreign friend, and relations with Russia were cooler.

Arms control and non-proliferation
The government has accepted the arms control obligations of the former Soviet Union, and acceded to the Nuclear Non-Proliferation Treaty as a non-nuclear state. It has also supported an active program by the U.S. Department of Defense Defense Threat Reduction Agency in western Uzbekistan (Nukus and the biological warfare test laboratory on Vozrozhdeniye Island).

Land Forces

The army includes five military districts. In 2001, the Tashkent garrison was transformed into the Tashkent Military District. The headquarters of the military districts and their areas of responsibility are as follows:

Air Forces
The Uzbek air forces consist of units formerly part of the 49th Air Army of the Turkestan Military District headquartered at Tashkent. There are two remaining combat units, brigades at Karshi-Khanabad and Dzhizak.

The 60th Separate Brigade is the former 735th Bomber Aviation Regiment combined with the former 87th Separate Reconnaissance Aviation Regiment. It has 31 Su-24s, 32 MiG-29s, and 6 Su-27s. Other recently disbanded units include the 61st Fighter Aviation Regiment at Kakaydy, which was itself a merger with the previous 115th Fighter Aviation Regiment, and the 62nd Fighter Aviation Regiment at Andijan. Regiments at both bases were disbanded in 1999. As many as 26 stored Su-17s, apparently in very bad condition, remain at Chirchiq (see Google Earth 41°30'05.69"N 69°33'44.90"E)

Other elements

Special units 
Different special units in the armed forces include the following:
Central Song and Dance Ensemble of the Armed Forces – Founded on 27 May 1992.
Honour Guard Battalion
Band of the Ministry of Defence
Band of the Ministry of the Interior
Band of the National Guard
Equestrian Squadron of the National Guard

Army Special Forces 
 15th Independent Special Forces Brigade
 17th Air Assault Brigade
 Independent Special Purpose Battalion "Lynx"
Uzbekistan formed Special Forces Battalions which are trained and formed by American and other NATO experts, located in provinces which border troubled republics like Afghanistan and Tajikistan. Units of the Special Operations Forces are based in the most important operational areas, including the mountainous areas of the Surkhandarya and Tashkent regions.

Paramilitary and militarized forces

The following institutions are uniformed and have military affiliations but are not part of the Armed Forces:

National Security Service (SNB), the country's secret police
Frontier Service (also called the Committee for State Border Protection of the National Security Service), the border guard of Uzbekistan. They have gotten into disagreements with the Kyrgyz Frontier Force in the Batken Region. The Frontier Service also operates the riverine naval assets of Uzbekistan, which include two Gyurza class gunboats.
Internal Troops, they are commonly used against Islamic terrorists in the border regions near Tajikistan and Kyrgyzstan. It maintains several Spetsnaz battalions:
Scorpion Group
Bars
Uzbekistan National Guard also serves as a specialized elite force.

Military industry 
In November 2017, at the initiative of President Mirziyoyev, the State Committee for Defense Industry was created, serving as an authorized body of state administration responsible for the implementation of state defense orders and defense production organization. Abbreviated by the Russian term of Goskomoboronprom, it has developed the country's industrial potential in the field of production of military and dual-use products. Under the committee, a joint Uzbek-Turkish enterprise for the production of military uniforms was created.

The following enterprises serve under the committee:

 State Unitary Enterprise Vostok
 State Enterprise CHARZ
 Center for Innovative Technologies
 TexMash
 RemTex
 KRANTAS

In 2020, the first Uzbek light armored personnel carrier began the process of development. The APCs, known as the Tarlon and Qalqon light armored vehicles, was designed and manufactured at the enterprises of the military-industrial complex. It designed for the protection and tracking of convoys, sanitary transportation, engineering, radiation, chemical and biological reconnaissance and fire support.

Military education

Higher education 
 Under the Defence Ministry
 Combined Arms
 Academy of the Armed Forces of Uzbekistan (formerly the Tashkent Higher All-Arms Command School)
 Military Institute of Information and Communication Technologies and Communications
Military Medical Academy (the former Military Medical Faculty of the Tashkent Medical Academy)
 Ground forces
 Chirchiq Higher Tank Command and Engineering School
 Samarkand Higher Military Automobile Command School
 Jizzakh Higher Military Technological University
 Air Force
Higher Military Aviation School
 Under Paramilitary services
Higher Military Customs Institute
 Academy of the Ministry of Internal Affairs of Uzbekistan
 Military-Technical Institute of the National Guard of Uzbekistan
Institute of Civil Defense of the Ministry of Emergency Affairs

NCO training 
In January 2001, Sergeant Training Schools were established in the Tashkent, Central, South-West and Eastern military districts. In 2007, a fifth sergeant training school was opened in the Northwest Military District. The curriculum of the Sergeant Training School provides servicemen with basic instruction in managing tactical units, professional command skills related to military specialization, accurate situational assessments and decision-making, and methods of organizing the use of weapons and military equipment. The training program is aimed at developing the leadership qualities of sergeants and maintaining healthy morale and military skills in military units.

Officers of the military, national police, special forces, and Ministry of Internal Affairs attend courses at the Joint Service Officer Training Academy in the capital.

Youth training 
In addition to the schools mentioned, four military lyceums (high schools) operate in Tashkent, Samarkand, Fergana and Urgench, all of which were established in 1993, are run by the military for pre-military education.

Military culture

Military oath 

The military oath is taken by conscripts as a legal basis of the beginning of their military service. The oath is administered by the commanding officer of the unit while a colour guard lowers the national flag for the soldier to kiss after he/she has taken the oath. The first military oath of the Armed Forces of Uzbekistan was adopted at the 10th session of the 12th convocation of the Supreme Soviet of Uzbekistan on 3 July 1992. The following is the text for the 1992 version of the oath:

With the entry of the Law "On General Military Commitment and Military Service" adopted by the Oliy Majlis in 2002, the oath was abolished and the original text was made unavailable. In April 2018, a long proposed new version of the oath was approved. The new version is as follows:

Holidays 
These are the military holidays observed by all service personnel the Uzbek Armed Forces:

 14 January – Defender of the Motherland Day
 15 February – International Duties Memorial Day
 5 April – National Security Service Day
 9 May – Day of Remembrance and Honour
 3rd day in August – Uzbek Air Force Day
 25 October – Police and Internal Affairs Servicemen's Day

Cultural institutions 

The armed forces maintains a number of cultural institutions that operated under the Ministry of Defense. Those institutions include the following:

State Museum of the Armed Forces of Uzbekistan – Founded in 1965 as the Museum of the Turkestan Military District, the State Museum of the Armed Forces is under the direct control of the Ministry of Defense, being located in the ministry's central building since May 1975. The museum exhibits over 10,000 pieces of memorabilia, including Second World War era tanks and military artifacts from the Timurid dynasty.
Tashkent House of Military Officers – The main building was built in 1885 and was used as a military assembly by the Imperial Russian Army before the October Revolution of 1917. In 1924, it housed the first House of the Red Army. In 1945, it became the House of Officers for the HQ Turkestan Military District. In the 1990s, after Uzbekistan gained its independence, it was renamed the Central House of Officers of the Ministry of Defense of Uzbekistan. Since 2013, the original building of the Central House of Officers has been occupied by the Tashkent State Institute of Law.
Center for Spirituality and Enlightenment of the Ministry of Defense

See also 

 List of equipment of the Armed Forces of the Republic of Uzbekistan

Citations

References

Further reading
Roger N. McDermott, The armed forces of the republic of Uzbekistan 1992-2002: Threats, influences and reform, The Journal of Slavic Military Studies, Volume 16, Issue 2 June 2003, pages 27 – 50

External links

 The Ministry of Defense on YouTube
  – Official Website
 State Committee for Defense Industry

 
Government of Uzbekistan